Bay Park is a hamlet and census-designated place (CDP) in the Town of Hempstead in Nassau County, on the South Shore of Long Island, in New York, United States. The population was 2,212 at the 2010 census.

History 
Bay Park was part of neighboring East Rockaway until 1912.

The Bay Park Civic & Property Owners' Association was established by residents in 1926, with the first meeting being held the next year, on June 24, 1927.

The Bay Park Sewage Treatment Plant, which is located in the hamlet and is operated by the County of Nassau as part of the Nassau County Sewage District, failed during and as a result of Hurricane Sandy in 2012. Subsequently, it would receive repairs and upgrades – notably in the early 2020s. The upgrades to the sewage plant will assist in cutting the nitrogen levels in the waters along that part of Long Island's South Shore.

Geography

Demographics

As of the census of 2000, there were 2,300 people, 874 households, and 636 families residing in the CDP. The population density was 5,305.4 per square mile (2,065.2/km2). There were 892 housing units at an average density of 2,057.6/sq mi (800.9/km2). The racial makeup of the CDP was 96.48% White, 0.35% African American, 0.04% Native American, 0.96% Asian, 0.04% Pacific Islander, 0.87% from other races, and 1.26% from two or more races. Hispanic or Latino of any race were 4.22% of the population.

There were 874 households, out of which 31.7% had children under the age of 18 living with them, 58.4% were married couples living together, 10.0% had a female householder with no husband present, and 27.2% were non-families. 21.1% of all households were made up of individuals, and 9.0% had someone living alone who was 65 years of age or older. The average household size was 2.63 and the average family size was 3.10.

In the CDP, the population was spread out, with 21.7% under the age of 18, 6.9% from 18 to 24, 31.7% from 25 to 44, 26.2% from 45 to 64, and 13.5% who were 65 years of age or older. The median age was 40 years. For every 100 females, there were 96.9 males. For every 100 females age 18 and over, there were 92.7 males.

The median income for a household in the CDP was $64,063, and the median income for a family was $64,950. Males had a median income of $48,125 versus $36,755 for females. The per capita income for the CDP was $25,888. About 2.2% of families and 2.4% of the population were below the poverty line, including 4.9% of those under age 18 and 2.8% of those age 65 or over.

Parks and recreation 

 Bay Park – A Nassau County-owned park within the hamlet.

Education

School districts 
Bay Park is primarily located within the boundaries of the East Rockaway Union Free School District, while the eponymous county park is located within the boundaries of the Oceanside Union Free School District; all homes within the hamlet are within the boundaries of the East Rockaway UFSD. As such, all children who reside within the hamlet and attend public schools go to East Rockaway's schools.

Library districts 
Bay Park is primarily located within the boundaries of the East Rockaway Library District, while the eponymous county park is located within the boundaries of the Oceanside Library District; the boundaries between both districts within the hamlet correspond with those for the school districts

References

External links 

 Bay Park Civic & Property Owner's Association

Hempstead, New York
Census-designated places in New York (state)
Hamlets in New York (state)
Census-designated places in Nassau County, New York
Hamlets in Nassau County, New York
Populated coastal places in New York (state)